Eric James McCormack (born April 18, 1963) is a Canadian actor known for his roles as Will Truman in the NBC sitcom Will & Grace, Grant MacLaren in Netflix's Travelers and Dr. Daniel Pierce in the TNT crime drama Perception.

Born in Toronto, McCormack started acting by performing in high school plays. He left Ryerson University in 1985 to accept a position with the Stratford Shakespeare Festival, where he spent five years performing in numerous stage productions.

For much of the late 1990s, he lived in Los Angeles and had minor roles. He made his feature film debut in the 1992 science-fiction adventure film The Lost World. McCormack appeared in several television series, including Top Cops, Street Justice, Lonesome Dove: The Series, Townies, and Ally McBeal. McCormack later gained worldwide recognition for playing Will Truman in Will & Grace, which premiered in September 1998. His performance has earned him six Golden Globe nominations and four Emmy nominations, ultimately winning the Primetime Emmy Award for Outstanding Lead Actor in a Comedy Series in 2001.

Aside from appearing in television, he made his Broadway debut in the 2001 production of The Music Man and starred in the 2005 film The Sisters. Following the series conclusion of Will & Grace in 2006, McCormack starred as the leading role in the New York production of Some Girl(s). He starred in the television miniseries The Andromeda Strain (2008) and returned to television in 2009 in the TNT drama Trust Me, which was cancelled after one season. Also in 2009, McCormack was cast in the science-fiction movie Alien Trespass. In addition, he starred as Dr. Daniel Pierce for three seasons of the TNT crime drama Perception, and provided the voice of "Lucky" on The Hub's Pound Puppies. From 2009 to 2010 he starred as Dr. Max Kershaw, the psychiatrist turned boyfriend of Julia Louis-Dreyfus' title character in The New Adventures of Old Christine.

Early life
McCormack was born in Toronto, Ontario, Canada, the son of Doris (1932–2006), a homemaker, and James "Keith" McCormack, an oil company financial analyst who died from cancer in 2008. He is the eldest of three siblings. McCormack has Scottish ancestry. While he was growing up, he was shy and did not play sports but was involved in theatre from an early age: "I was a bit of an outsider, but I discovered theatre very early on, which got me through." McCormack later attended Sir John A. Macdonald Collegiate Institute in Scarborough, Ontario, where he was a classmate of David Furnish. There, he enrolled in theatre classes and performed in high school productions of Godspell and Pippin. McCormack recalls that after performing in Godspell, his feelings toward becoming an actor solidified and he decided to pursue a career in acting. "I remember after the first performance of that... I knew where to fit in. That was the beginning of my life as an actor. It changed me in that the concept of any other options disappeared. From that moment there was no question. I knew exactly what I was going to do. I'm lucky that way."

McCormack graduated from high school in 1982 and then enrolled at Ryerson University School of Theatre in Toronto to further improve his acting. He left Ryerson in 1985, several months before graduating, to accept a position with the Stratford Shakespeare Festival in Stratford, Ontario, where he spent five seasons performing. "It was all I wanted, to be a classical actor for the rest of my life, but during the last couple of years I was there, I started to realise that it wasn't for me. Perhaps I didn't have to give my Hamlet before I died, that the world might be an OK place without my Hamlet, in fact." McCormack appeared in productions of A Midsummer Night's Dream, Henry V, Murder in the Cathedral and Three Sisters. McCormack later performed with the Manitoba Theatre Centre in a production of Burn This, as well as with Toronto's Royal Alexandra Theatre in Biloxi Blues.

Career

Early work
McCormack made his Canadian television debut in the 1986 movie The Boys from Syracuse." McCormack moved to Los Angeles, California, and made his US television debut in a 1991 episode of the CBS crime series Top Cops. He appeared in the 1992 theatrical films The Lost World, based on Conan Doyle's novel of the same name and in its sequel, Return to the Lost World, also released in 1992. By 1993, he landed a recurring role as a detective in the crime drama Street Justice. Also in 1993, McCormack appeared in the television movie Double, Double, Toil and Trouble, playing Mary-Kate and Ashley Olsen's father.

He played the role of Colonel Francis Clay Mosby in 42 episodes of the Western television series Lonesome Dove: The Series (1994), which was later renamed Lonesome Dove: The Outlaw Years (1995). McCormack commented that it was a "fantastic role". In an interview with The Guardian in 2003, McCormack admitted to auditioning "two or three times" for the part of Ross Geller, which ultimately went to David Schwimmer, for the situation comedy Friends. In 1995, he appeared in the television film The Man Who Wouldn't Die. He was cast in the 1997 made-for-television movie Borrowed Hearts, where he portrayed a selfish businessman who learns to love, and in the HBO film Exception to the Rule, in which he played a cheating husband.

Also in 1997, he had minor roles in the comedy shows Townies, Veronica's Closet, and Ally McBeal. Originally, McCormack was scheduled to appear as a series regular in the NBC sitcom Jenny, but was fired after the pilot due to the network cutting his character. In addition, McCormack had a recurring role in season five of the comedy series The New Adventures of Old Christine, in which he played a therapist and love interest for Julia Louis-Dreyfus's character, Christine.

Will & Grace
McCormack received his breakthrough role in 1998 when he was cast as gay lawyer Will Truman on the NBC sitcom Will & Grace. McCormack said that when the part came along, he was convinced he was right for the role. "At the end of the audition, Max Mutchnick, co-creator and executive producer of the show said 'That was perfect. Just to let you know, you never have to be more gay than that.'" He explained that when he first read the script, "what hit me immediately was that this was me. I mean, sexual orientation aside, Will was so much like me. He's a great host, he's relatively funny and he has great friends and he's a good friend to them ... the gay issue just wasn't really a big thing." The show debuted on September 21, 1998, and was watched by almost 8.6 million American viewers. Will & Grace quickly developed a loyal audience, with the show and McCormack receiving strong reviews. John Carman of the San Francisco Chronicle commented that McCormack and costar Debra Messing (who played Will's best friend Grace Adler) worked "nicely" together. Kay McFadden of The Seattle Times also praised McCormack, Messing, and the supporting cast as "very funny". For this performance, he earned four Emmy Award nominations (2000, 2001, 2003, 2005), one of which resulted in a win (2001), for Outstanding Lead Actor in a Comedy Series. In addition, he received five Golden Globe Award nominations.

Also in 1998, McCormack appeared in Stephen Herek's comedy film Holy Man. The film was critically and financially unsuccessful. The following year he starred in the comedy movie Free Enterprise (1999), a movie about two filmmakers (McCormack and Rafer Weigel) obsessed with actor William Shatner and Star Trek. Film critic Kevin Thomas of the Los Angeles Times wrote that McCormack and Weigel "both make a strong impression". In 2000, McCormack appeared in the ABC television movie The Audrey Hepburn Story, portraying actor Mel Ferrer.

During the 2001 Broadway season, McCormack briefly portrayed Professor Harold Hill (replacing Craig Bierko) in the Susan Stroman revival of The Music Man at the Neil Simon Theatre. In August 2002, as part of the Hollywood Bowl's summer concert series, he reprised the role of Harold Hill for a one-night only appearance in which he and other actors recreated the songs from the production. McCormack hosted the fourth episode of the 28th season of the sketch comedy show Saturday Night Live  on November 2, 2002. In 2004, he had a recurring role as Ray Summers on Showtime's comedy drama Dead Like Me. The following year, McCormack starred in the film The Sisters, based on Anton Chekhov's play Three Sisters. The film premiered at the 2005 Tribeca Film Festival.

Will & Grace's eighth and (at the time) final season ended with the series finale on May 18, 2006. The finale garnered 18 million American viewers, making it the most-watched entertainment telecast in six years.

In January 2017, NBC closed a deal for a new, 10-episode season of Will & Grace during the 2017–18 season. The new show has been branded as a "reboot", or "revival", taking place 11 years after the original series' finale episode, and McCormack has reprised his role of the beloved Will Truman. In April 2017, the episode order was increased to 12 episodes. In August 2017, it was extended again, to 16 episodes, and a second 13-episode season was ordered. In March 2018, NBC ordered five more episodes for the revival's second season, bringing the total to 18 episodes, and also renewed the show for an 18-episode third season. Eric McCormack continued his role of Will Truman for all of the announced seasons of the revival.

After Will & Grace

Following the end of Will & Grace, McCormack starred on the New York stage opposite Fran Drescher, Judy Reyes, Brooke Smith, and Maura Tierney, in Neil LaBute's off-Broadway play Some Girl(s) at the Lucille Lortel Theatre. He plays a writer who is ready to settle down and marry, but decides to visit four ex-girlfriends first. For his performance, McCormack received critical reviews. New York Times contributor Ben Brantley, in review of the production, wrote: "Playing a thoughtless, woman-despising heterosexual, Mr. McCormack isn't much different from when he was playing a thoughtful, woman-worshiping homosexual. As in Will & Grace, he italicizes every other line for maximum comic spin and punctuates his dialogue by earnestly furrowing his features". Brantley went on to say that McCormack's interpretation of the character is "certainly a more slickly sustained performance" than the one delivered by David Schwimmer in 2005. Melissa Rose Bernardo of Entertainment Weekly commented that McCormack and Maura Tierney "have incredible chemistry".

In the same year, McCormack produced the Lifetime comedy Lovespring International, a show that revolves around six employees at Lovespring International, a dating agency located in California as an "elite Beverly Hills" company. The series debuted to ambivalent reviews, with Matthew Gilbert of The Boston Globe commenting that Lovespring International is "a lively little cable exercise in over-the-top characters, bad taste, satire, and political incorrectness." The show was cancelled that same year.

In 2008, McCormack co-starred in the A&E television miniseries The Andromeda Strain, a remake of the 1971 movie based on the novel by Michael Crichton. In the miniseries, he played Jack Nash, a television reporter who battles an addiction to cocaine. The Andromeda Strain received mixed reviews, and McCormack's performance was criticized. Joanna Weiss of the Boston Globe wrote, "The presence of Eric McCormack, as an intrepid TV reporter, is especially extraneous (no disrespect to intrepid reporters)." Robert Bianco of USA Today commented, "The central cast is completed by ... poor Eric McCormack as a crusading, coke-addicted journalist who spends the second half of the movie playing Rambo in the desert. Let's just say McCormack does the best he can with what he's given, and leave it at that." On September 5, 2008, McCormack made a guest appearance in the seventh season and 100th episode of the television series Monk, where he played an unctuous host of a television crime docudrama.

In January 2009, McCormack returned to television in the TNT drama Trust Me, co-starring Tom Cavanagh. The series, set around a fictional advertising firm, starred McCormack as Mason McGuire, the firm's newly promoted creative director, and deals with his best friend's (Cavanagh) unpredictable behavior. In an interview with USA Weekend, McCormack revealed he was not afraid of being typecast. McCormack's decision to do the show was due to "great writing". The show debuted on January 26, 2009, and was watched by almost 3.4 million viewers. Trust Me debuted to very positive reviews, with Tim Goodman of the San Francisco Chronicle writing, "...the series is surprisingly solid." Mary McNamara of the Los Angeles Times wrote that McCormack and Cavanagh "manage to keep their characters sharply defined but low-key. They are opposites but not in an ash-smudged, Windex-wielding Felix and Oscar way." The series, however, was cancelled after one season, due to poor ratings.

McCormack starred in the science-fiction film Alien Trespass (2009), in which he played Doctor Ted Lewis, who gets possessed by an alien marshal, Urp, after he crash-lands on Earth. When asked about his interpretation on the character, McCormack commented that his first instinct was to make Ted Lewis more alien, sounding like Spock. The film was critically and financially unsuccessful.

In May 2009, he portrayed "El Gallo" in Reprise Theatre Company's revival of the 1960s musical The Fantasticks at UCLA's Freud Playhouse. McCormack had a supporting role in Richard Loncraine's comedy My One and Only, which was released in August 2009.

On September 30, 2009, he guest-starred on the police procedural drama Law & Order: Special Victims Unit in the second episode of its 11th season playing an owner of a dating website.

McCormack portrayed con artist Clark Rockefeller in the Lifetime television movie Who Is Clark Rockefeller?, which premiered on March 13, 2010. To prepare for the role, he read everything on the case, including coverage of the case and Rockefeller's jailhouse interview. Who Is Clark Rockefeller? received mixed reaction, but McCormack's performance was favored by critics, with Variety's Brian Lowry concluding, "...the real kitsch factor resides in Eric McCormack's performance as the suave charmer, which adds an element of high camp to the proceedings."

In June 2010, McCormack received the NBC Universal Canada Award of Distinction at the Banff TV Festival. In October 2010, McCormack received a star on Canada's Walk of Fame. In 2018, McCormack received a star on the Hollywood Walk of Fame for his contributions to the television industry.

In October 2010, it was reported that McCormack would star in a new TNT television drama, Perception, playing a crime-solving neuroscientist named Dr. Daniel Pierce, who works with the federal government to solve cases using his knowledge and imaginative view of the world. Perception premiered on July 9, 2012. McCormack also serves as producer for the show. He also provides the voice of "Lucky" on The Hub's Pound Puppies series, which premiered October 10, 2010.

From March 6 through July 8, 2012, he played the role of Senator Joseph Cantwell in the Broadway revival of Gore Vidal’s The Best Man.

In February 2015, he guest-starred on an episode of NBC's The Mysteries of Laura which stars Debra Messing, his former co-star on Will & Grace.

McCormack starred in Travelers, a science fiction drama which first aired in October 2016 and ran for three seasons.

In 2020, he narrated a portion of the 8th Canadian Screen Awards.

Other projects
McCormack has set up his own production company called Big Cattle Productions to develop ideas for television. The projects produced by the company include Lovespring International and Imperfect Union. In 2003, it was confirmed that he would write, direct, and star in the romantic comedy What You Wish For.

McCormack recorded a song, "The Greatest Discovery", which was written by Elton John and Bernie Taupin in 1970, for the 2006 album Unexpected Dreams – Songs From the Stars. He also wrote and sang a song called "Living with Grace" for the 2004 soundtrack to Will & Grace with piano music provided by Barry Manilow.

Personal life
McCormack has been married to Janet Leigh Holden, whom he met on the set of Lonesome Dove, since August 1997. They have a son. McCormack maintains residences in Los Angeles and Vancouver. He became a US citizen in 1999 and holds dual Canadian and US citizenship.

McCormack is involved in many Los Angeles and Canadian-based charitable organizations including Project Angel Food. The Wellness Community West Los Angeles Tribute to the Human Spirit Awards dinner presented an award to McCormack for his breast cancer awareness advocacy. He shared with the audience how his comedy helped his mother, Doris McCormack, endure her breast cancer treatments. Doris was honored at the Lifetime's Breast Cancer Heroes Luncheon in 2004. He serves as an honorary board member of the Multiple Myeloma Research Foundation (MMRF) and was given the MMRF Spirit of Hope Award in October 2006.

McCormack sang both the American and Canadian national anthems at the 2004 NHL All-Star game in Minnesota. McCormack is a supporter of same-sex marriage and attended a march in Fresno, California, on May 30, 2009, after the Supreme Court of California upheld a ban on same-sex marriage approved by voters in November by ballot Proposition 8.

McCormack is a Democrat.

Filmography

Film

Television

Awards and nominations

References

External links

 
 
 

1963 births
Living people
20th-century American male actors
21st-century American male actors
20th-century Canadian male actors
21st-century Canadian male actors
Male actors from Los Angeles
Male actors from Toronto
Male actors from Vancouver
American male film actors
American male musical theatre actors
American male television actors
California Democrats
Canadian emigrants to the United States
Canadian male film actors
Canadian male musical theatre actors
Canadian people of Scottish descent
Canadian socialists
Canadian male television actors
Canadian LGBT rights activists
American LGBT rights activists
Outstanding Performance by a Lead Actor in a Comedy Series Primetime Emmy Award winners
Toronto Metropolitan University alumni
Activists from California